Codie Prevost (born December 19, 1984) is a Canadian country music artist. He is a four time Canadian Country Music Association (CCMA) nominee and a six time Saskatchewan Country Music Association (SCMA) Entertainer of the Year and Male Vocalist of the Year winner. In total, he has received 26 SCMA Awards. Prevost's past performances include CMA Music Festival, Dauphin Countryfest, South by Southwest, American Tours Festival, Havelock Country Jamboree, Craven Country Jamboree and Manitoulin Island Country Fest.

Prevost released two full-length albums and one EP on his own label, Good Spirit Records. He started his climb onto the country music scene in 2005 after recording his debut album, The Road Ahead. In 2010, he released his second album, Get Loud, which helped him to earn the SCMA awards for Entertainer of the Year and Male Vocalist of the Year. Nashville Music Guide rated the album with 6 out of 7 stars. He has since been nominated for the Canadian Country Music Association Rising Star Award in both 2011 and 2012. Prevost was selected as one of the Top 12 out of 7,500 artists in the world in the Unsigned Only Competition. He has four official music videos on CMT, the most recent video being his latest single "Last Night All Day." He has been featured on ET Canada and has opened for Joe Nichols, The Oak Ridge Boys and Florida Georgia Line. He was nominated at the CCMA Awards for Interactive Artist of the Year in 2013.

Discography

Studio albums

Extended plays

Singles

Guest singles

Music videos

Awards and nominations

References

External links

Codie Prevost at CMT

1984 births
Canadian male singer-songwriters
Living people
Musicians from Saskatchewan
Independent Music Awards winners
Canadian country singer-songwriters
21st-century Canadian male singers